The All Japan Kendo Federation (AJKF) or Zen Nihon Kendō Renmei (全日本剣道連盟 abbreviated 全剣連 Zen Ken Ren) is a national non-governmental organization in Japan, founded in 1952 and officially formed on March 14, 1954.

Purpose
The All Japan Kendo Federation (AJKF) promotes and popularises kendō, iaidō and jōdō.

Membership
The All Japan Kendo Federation (AJKF) has been member of the International Kendo Federation (FIK) since it was founded in 1970.

The All Japan Kendo Federation (AJKF) is a member of the Japanese Budo Association (Nippon Budo Shingikai) and the Nippon Budokan Foundation.

Championships
The first All Japan Kendo Championship were conducted in 1953.

Register of Dan Grades
A census of members of the forty-seven prefectural associations affiliated to the AJKF made in March 2006 showed there were 1,429,718 members including 401,121 women and about half are dan graded.

See also
Zen Nippon Kendo Renmei Iaido
All Japan Kendo Championship
Kendo around the world

References

External links
 All Japan Kendo Federation Website of All Japan Kendo Federation.

Kendo
Sports organizations established in 1952
Kendo organizations
Japanese swordsmanship
Jojutsu